The Kaziranga National Park is home to a wide variety of aquatic life including about 42 species of freshwater fish. These species include speciality species such as a freshwater pufferfish Tetraodon cutcutia.

List of fishes found in Kaziranga

 Amblypharyngodon mola
 Amphipnous cuchia
 Bagarius bagarius
 Xenentodon cancila
 Catla catla
 Chanda nama
 Channa amphibia
 Channa orientalis
 Channa marulius
 Channa punctata
 Channa striatus
 Cirrhina mrigala
 Clarius batrachus
 Colisa lalius
 Colisa fasciata
 Eutropiichthys vachaH
 Gudiusia chapra
 Glossogobius giuris
 Heteropneustes fossilis
 Labeo bata
 Labeo calbasu
 Labeo rohita
 Labeo nandina
 Labeo gonius
 Mastacembelus armatus
 Mystus bleekeri
 Mystus cavasius
 Mystus menoda
 Aorichthys seenghala
 Mystus vittatus
 Nandus nandus
 Notopterus chitala
 Notopterus notopterus
 Ompak pabo
 Salmostoma bacaila
 Puntius ticto
 Puntius sarana
 Rasbora daniconius
 Rasbora elenga
 Tetraodon cutcutia
 Wallago attu
 Anabas testudineus

See also
List of fish in India

References

External links
 Kaziranga National Park in UNESCO List
 Kaziranga Centenary 1905-2005
 World Conservation Monitoring Centre

Kaziranga
Lists of fauna of Kaziranga National Park
Kaziranga National Park